The 1979 All-Ireland Minor Hurling Championship was the 49th staging of the All-Ireland Minor Hurling Championship since its establishment by the Gaelic Athletic Association in 1928.

Cork entered the championship as the defending champions.

On 2 September 1979 Cork won the championship following a 2-11 to 1-9 defeat of Kilkenny in the All-Ireland final. This was their second All-Ireland title in-a-row and their 14th overall.

Results

Leinster Minor Hurling Championship

Leinster first round

Leinster quarter-finals

Leinster semi-finals

Leinster final

Munster Minor Hurling Championship

Munster first round

Munster semi-finals

Munster final

All-Ireland Minor Hurling Championship

All-Ireland semi-final

All-Ireland final

External links
 All-Ireland Minor Hurling Championship: Roll Of Honour

Minor
All-Ireland Minor Hurling Championship